Feliz Navidad is a phrase meaning "Happy Christmas" or "Merry Christmas" in Spanish.

It may also refer to:

 Feliz Navidad (José Feliciano album), 1970
 Feliz Navidad (Héctor Lavoe album), 1979
 Feliz Navidad (Menudo album), 1982
 "Feliz Navidad" (song), a 1970 song by José Feliciano and a Christmas classic song
 "Feliz Navidad", a 1997 Christmas song by Irán Castillo
Feliz Navidad, a 2006 Christmas film starring Giselle Blondet
 Feliz Navidad, an album by Rolando Villazón
 Felix Navidad, an line in the song Christmas EveL by Stray Kids